Richard Searle (christened 12 October 1789 at Lurgashall, Sussex; details of death unknown) was an English professional cricketer who played first-class cricket from 1822 to 1835.  He was mainly associated with Sussex and made 3 known appearances in first-class matches.

References

External links

Bibliography
 Arthur Haygarth, Scores & Biographies, Volume 1 (1744–1826), Lillywhite, 1862

1789 births
Date of death unknown
English cricketers
English cricketers of 1787 to 1825
Sussex cricketers
Year of death missing